Əsədli (also, Asadly, Asalty, and Asatly) is a village and municipality in the Sabirabad Rayon of Azerbaijan.  It has a population of 1,419.

References 

Populated places in Sabirabad District